Notability is a note-taking application for iOS and macOS. The application allows note-taking and the annotation of PDF files. Notability is the best-selling paid note-taking app on the App Store.

Features
Like other note-taking software, Notability supports typing and drawing on a virtual notepad. The app supports directly editing and exporting to the PDF file format, and supports many other document file formats. Files are synced to iCloud and users can share files with other users via a link-based system. The app also supports multiple other features including simultaneous audio recording and the conversion of handwriting and math equations to text.

Notability supports the usage of a stylus on desktop platforms and the Apple Pencil on the iPad.

References

External links

Note-taking software
Proprietary cross-platform software
Mobile software
MacOS software
IOS software
2010 software
PDF readers
PDF software
IPadOS software